My Own Worst Enemy may refer to:

My Own Worst Enemy (TV series), an American action/drama TV series
"My Own Worst Enemy" (Scrubs), an episode of the American TV sitcom Scrubs
"My Own Worst Enemy" (song), song by rock band Lit
"My Own Worst Enemy", a song by Napalm Death from Diatribes, 1996
"My Own Worst Enemy", a song by Saliva from Cinco Diablo, 2008
"My Own Worst Enemy", a song by Stereophonics from Decade in the Sun: Best of Stereophonics
My Own Worst Enemy (album), album by Pete Rock with Edo G